"Hardwired" is a song by heavy metal band Metallica. It was released as the lead single from their tenth studio album, Hardwired... to Self-Destruct (2016), on August 18, 2016 as a digital download. The song was first played live near the end of the band's show at U.S. Bank Stadium in Minneapolis on August 20, 2016. The song received a nomination for Best Rock Song at the 2017 Grammy Awards.

Background
The band detailed on the song's debut at The Howard Stern Show that it was a rather late addition to the album. Lars Ulrich explained that after finishing the other songs "we decided that we needed a short, fast opener", leading him and James Hetfield to compose "Hardwired" in about a week in June 2016.

Music video
The music video was released on August 18, 2016. Filmed in black-and-white, it features the band performing the song in the dark under rapidly flashing strobe lights, as the camera continuously rotates around the band members.

Personnel
 James Hetfield – vocals, rhythm guitar
 Lars Ulrich – drums
 Kirk Hammett – lead guitar
 Robert Trujillo – bass

Charts

Weekly charts

Year-end charts

References

2016 songs
Metallica songs
Songs written by James Hetfield
Songs written by Lars Ulrich
Black-and-white music videos